Dermatocarpon is a genus of lichens in the family Verrucariaceae.

Members of the genus are commonly called stippleback lichens because they have fruiting structures called perithecia that are flask-shaped structures embedded in the nonfruiting body (thallus), with a hole in the top to release spores, causing an appearance of being covered with small black dots.

Species
Dermatocarpon americanum 
Dermatocarpon arenosaxi  – United States
Dermatocarpon arnoldianum 
Dermatocarpon atrogranulosum  – Canada
Dermatocarpon bachmannii 
Dermatocarpon deminuens 
Dermatocarpon dolomiticum  – United States
Dermatocarpon intestiniforme 
Dermatocarpon leptophyllodes 
Dermatocarpon leptophyllum 
Dermatocarpon linkolae 
Dermatocarpon lorenzianum 
Dermatocarpon luridum 
Dermatocarpon meiophyllizum 
Dermatocarpon moulinsii 
Dermatocarpon miniatum 
Dermatocarpon muhlenbergii 
Dermatocarpon multifolium  – United States
Dermatocarpon polyphyllizum 
Dermatocarpon reticulatum 
Dermatocarpon rivulorum 
Dermatocarpon schaechtelinii 
Dermatocarpon taminium 
Dermatocarpon tenue 
Dermatocarpon tomentulosum  – USA; Bahamas
Dermatocarpon vellereum

References

Gallery

Verrucariales
Eurotiomycetes genera
Lichen genera
Taxa described in 1824
Taxa named by Franz Gerhard Eschweiler